George (Георгий in Russian, died 1079) was an Eastern Orthodox Metropolitan of Kiev and all Rus', serving from 1069 to 1073. 

George was the seventh Byzantine church leader in Kievan Rus, and he arrived to what is now Ukraine around 1062. George did not recognize the sanctity of the local martyrs, and four years after his appointment he returned to Byzantium.

Metropolitan George is the author of polemical work "Struggle with the Latin" (Stiazanie s latinoiu) in relation to the 1054 East–West Schism

See also
Theological differences between the Catholic Church and the Eastern Orthodox Church

References 

Metropolitans of Kiev and all Rus' (988–1441)
11th-century Byzantine bishops
11th-century Eastern Orthodox bishops
11th-century births
11th-century deaths
11th century in Kievan Rus'